Nurserik Kadyrsizovich Kudereev is a Director of the Moscow Office of JSOC KazMunayGaz. He is currently married with two children.

Biography

Born February 14, 1969 to a family of Kazakh civil servants in South Kazakhstan Region, during 1987–1989 he served in Germany.

In 1995 he was appointed Commercial Director of Karaspan LLP for two years. In 1997 he became a Deputy Director General of Alma-Oil Corp. In 1999 he became a Deputy Director General of the Supplies Department of the national oil company Kazakh-Oil. In 2002 he transferred to the President of the Kazakh Republic Office as a Deputy Director on General Issues of the Department of Presidential Affairs. In 2002 Kudereev moved to Moscow with his family to become Chief of Administration in the Kazakhstan Embassy in the Russian Federation. He was made Director General of the Moscow Office of JSOC KazMunayGaz in 2003.

Public life 

Kudereev actively supports programs of the Islamic Cultural Center of Russia (ICCR) and works with social and religious organizations for the development of interethnic and intercultural dialogue.

External links 
 «Ислам в Казахстане – больше, чем просто религия»
 КазМунайГаз - Официальный сайт

1969 births
Living people
People from Turkistan Region
Russian civil servants